Antonio Ferraz Núñez (born 28 June 1929) is a Spanish former road racing cyclist. Professional from 1953 to 1961, he was a two-time national road race champion and also won a stage of the 1957 Vuelta a España.

Major results
1955
 1st Stages 6b Vuelta a Andalucía
 2nd Overall GP Ayutamiento de Bilbao
1st Stages 3 & 4
1956
 1st  National Road Race Championships
 1st Circuito de Getxo
 1st Campeonato Vasco-Navarro de Montaña
 1st Stage 2 Vuelta a Asturias
1957
 1st  National Road Race Championships
 1st Stage 14 Vuelta a España
 1st Trofeo Jaumendreu
1958
 1st GP Llodio
1959
 1st GP Llodio

References

External links

1929 births
Spanish male cyclists
Spanish Vuelta a España stage winners
Living people
People from Enkarterri
Sportspeople from Biscay
Cyclists from the Basque Country (autonomous community)